The 1977 season in Swedish football, starting April 1977 and ending November 1977:

Honours

Official titles

Notes

References 
Online

 
Seasons in Swedish football